Melanie Dodd (born 10 May 1973) is an Australian former swimmer who specialized in sprint freestyle events. She represented the host nation Australia, as a 27-year-old, at the 2000 Summer Olympics, and also trained for the Australian Institute of Sport, under Russian-based swim coach Gennadi Touretski. She won two medals, a silver and bronze, in the 4×100-metre freestyle relay at the 1995 FINA Short Course World Championships in Rio de Janeiro, and 1999 FINA Short Course World Championships in Hong Kong.

Dodd competed only in the women's 4×100-metre freestyle relay at the 2000 Summer Olympics in Sydney. On the first night of the Games, the Aussie team pulled off a sixth-place finish in the final with a time of 3:40.91. Teaming with Sarah Ryan, Elka Graham and Giaan Rooney in heat two on the morning prelims, Dodd swam the third leg and recorded a split of 56.31 to post a fifth-seeded time of 3:43.56 for the home squad.

References

External links
Profile – Australian Olympic Team 
Athlete's Profile – ABC Sydney 2000 Coverage 

1973 births
Living people
Olympic swimmers of Australia
Swimmers at the 2000 Summer Olympics
Australian female freestyle swimmers
Swimmers from Sydney